, better known as , was Japanese waka poet and Buddhist priest. In the poetry anthology Kokin Wakashū, he is listed as one of the six notable waka poets and one of the thirty-six immortals of poetry.

Biography
Munesada was the eighth son of Dainagon , who was a son of Emperor Kanmu, relegated to civilian life. After Emperor Nimmyō died in 850, Munesada became a monk due to his grief, taking the religious name Henjō (literally “Universally Illuminated”). He was a priest of the Tendai school. 

In 877 Munesada founded  in Yamashina, in the southeast part of Kyoto, but continued to be active in court politics. In 869 he was given another temple, in the north of Kyoto and managed both temples. In 885 he was ranked high priest and was called .

He was rumored to have had a love affair with the famous female poet Ono no Komachi.

Thirty-five of his waka were included in imperial anthologies including Kokin Wakashū. The preface to Ki no Tsurayuki criticized him: "he knows how to construct waka, but there is less real emotion. It is like when you see a picture of a woman and it moves your heart".

His son, Sosei, was also a waka poet and a monk.

Poetry 
Henjō was famous for the following poem from the Hyakunin Isshu:

References

Japanese male poets
816 births
890 deaths
9th-century Japanese poets
Hyakunin Isshu poets
Heian period Buddhist clergy